The Ruwenzori vlei rat (Otomys dartmouthi) is a species of rodent in the family Muridae.
It is found only in Uganda.
Its natural habitat is subtropical or tropical high-altitude grassland.

References

Otomys
Mammals described in 1906
Taxa named by Oldfield Thomas
Taxonomy articles created by Polbot